Joseph Stappers (born 13 June 1942) is a Belgian water polo player. He competed in the men's tournament at the 1964 Summer Olympics.

References

1942 births
Living people
Belgian male water polo players
Olympic water polo players of Belgium
Water polo players at the 1964 Summer Olympics
Sportspeople from Antwerp
20th-century Belgian people